Ayyub Musallam Ya'qub Musallam (1905–2001) was a public speaker, writer and politician. He served as Mayor of Bethlehem from 1957–1962, Parliament member, Cabinet member and President of the Arab Rehabilitation Society, Bethlehem / Beit Jala.

References

website of his son

Mayors of Bethlehem
2001 deaths
1905 births